Abele Rizieri Ferrari (May 12, 1890 – November 29, 1922), better known by the pen name Renzo Novatore, was an Italian individualist anarchist, illegalist and anti-fascist poet, philosopher and militant, now mostly known for his posthumously published book Toward the Creative Nothing (Verso il nulla creatore) and associated with ultra-modernist trends of futurism. His thought was influenced by Max Stirner, Friedrich Nietzsche, Georges Palante, Oscar Wilde, Henrik Ibsen, Arthur Schopenhauer and Charles Baudelaire.

Biography

Background
Abele Ricieri Ferrari was born in Arcola, Liguria, Italy on May 12, 1890 in a poor peasant family. He did not adjust to school discipline and quit in the first year never coming back after that. While he worked in his father's farm, he self-educated himself with an emphasis in poetry and philosophy. Around his town, he was surrounded by a vibrant anarchist scene which he started to come close to.

Writing and action
He discovered Max Stirner, Errico Malatesta, Peter Kropotkin, Henrik Ibsen, and  Friedrich Nietzsche, whom Novatore often quoted. From 1908 on he embraced individualist anarchism. In 1910, he was charged with the burning of a local church and spent three months in prison, but his participation in the fire was never proven. A year later, he went on the lam for several months because the police wanted him for theft and robbery. On September 30, 1911, the police arrested him for vandalism. He justified refusal of work and he thought, in his personal philosophy of life, that he has the right to expropriate from the rich people what he needed for his daily survival, and using force wasn't a problem for him.

In 1914, he began to write for anarchist papers. He was drafted in 1912 but quickly discharged for unknown causes. As the Great War approached he deserted his regiment on April 26, 1918 and was sentenced to death by a military tribunal for desertion and high treason on October 31. He left his village and fled, propagating the desertion from the Army and the armed uprising against the state. Novatore was married with two children at the time and when his younger son died in the last months of 1918, Novatore came back to his home, risking the arrest only to give him a last goodbye.

He was involved in an anarcho-futurist collective in La Spezia which he led (along with Auro d'Arcola) to be active in the militant anti-fascist Arditi del Popolo. He was close friends with Enzo Martucci and Bruno Filippi. Renzo Novatore wrote for many anarchist papers (Cronaca Libertaria, Il Libertario, Iconoclastal, Gli Scamiciati, Nichilismo, Pagine Libere) where he debated with other anarchists (among them Camillo Berneri). He published a magazine, Vertice, which has been lost apart from few articles. Novatore collaborated in the individualist anarchist journal Iconoclasta! alongside the young stirnerist illegalist Bruno Filippi.

Death
In May 1919, the city of La Spezia fell under control of a self-proclaimed Revolutionary Committee and he fought alongside it. On June 30, 1919, Novatore was hidden in a hut in the countries near the city of Sarzana. A farmer told the police about him and he was sentenced to ten years in prison, but was released in a general amnesty a few months later. By the early 1920s Italy was about to be taken over by Fascism. He decided to go underground and in 1922 he joined the gang of the famous robber of anarchist inspiration: .

He was killed in an ambush by carabinieri in Teglia, near Genoa, on November 29, 1922 while being with Pollastro but Pollastro managed to escape. On Novatore's body the detectives found some false documents, a Browning gun with two full magazines, one hand grenade and a ring with a secret container filled with a lethal dose of cyanide.

Worldview

Novatore talked of the "heroic beauty of the anti-collectivist and creative I" which is beyond both bourgeois and proletarian manners and morality. He spoke of his individual situation as living "In the Reign of the Phantoms" recalling Stirner. He summarizes his view of his situation as existing among social conformism saying "The world is one pestulant church covetous and slimy where all have an idol to fetishistically adore and an altar on which to sacrifice themself."

In this way he speaks of religion saying "if you will patiently await the desolate calvary to then nail yourself on the cross, becoming the image of ME that is the ManGod, you will be the perfect human creature worthy of sitting at the right of my father who is in the kingdom of heaven.". As far as democracy and the legacy of the Enlightenment he says "the French Revolution says to you: I have proclaimed the rights of man. If you will enter devoutly in the symbolic cloister of human social justice to sublimate and humanize through the moral canon of social life, you will be a citizen and I will give you the rights I proclaimed to man." "Progress (?) and Civilization (?), Religion (?) and the Ideal (?), have closed life in a mortal circle where the phantoms most grim have erected their viscid reign. Time to end it! We must break the circle violently and exit".

As an exit of this situation he proclaims "revolution is the fire of our will and a need of our solitary minds; it is an obligation of the libertarian aristocracy. To create new ethical values. To create new aesthetic values. To communalize material wealth. To individualize spiritual wealth. Because we-violent celebralists and passional sentimentalists at the same time-understand and know that revolution is a necessity of the silent sorrow that suffers at the bottom and a need of the free spirits who suffer in the heights." He summarizes the three options in life as "The stream of slavery, the stream of tyranny, the stream of freedom! With revolution, the last of these streams needs to burst upon the other two and overwhelm them. It needs to create spiritual beauty, teach the poor the shame of their poverty, and the rich the shame of their wealth."

Nevertheless, Novatore had an individualist permanent conception of revolution which he believed could at some point come into conflict with the masses. He wrote, "You are waiting for the revolution! Very well! My own began a long time ago! When you are ready – God, what an endless wait! – it won’t nauseate me to go along the road awhile with you! But when you stop, I will continue on my mad and triumphant march toward the great and sublime conquest of Nothing!". Alongside this, he manifests an insurrectionary point of view such as when he manifests that "Every society you build will have its fringes, and on the fringes of every society, heroic and restless vagabonds will wander, with their wild and virgin thoughts, only able to live by preparing ever new and terrible outbreaks of rebellion!".

He says he views "Only ethical and spiritual wealth" as "invulnerable.
This is the true property of individuals. The rest no!
The rest is vulnerable! And all that is vulnerable will be violated!" Novatore sees thoses similar to him as "anarchists. And individualists, and nihilists, and aristocrats." and as "the lovers of every miracle, the promoters of every prodigy, the creators of every wonder!"; "the enemies of all material domination and all spiritual leveling."

He adheres to nihilism but denies "christian nihilism" as he sees it denies life. He says instead "Since the only serious people are those who know how to be actively engaged laughing." and so the individualists must go "Forward, for the destruction of the lie and of the phantoms! Forward, for the complete conquest of individuality and of Life!". Novatore described himself as an anarchist and defined that term as follows;

Novatore is critical of the individualism of Herbert Spencer which he thinks "it is true that he fights against the state, but he fights against it only because the state as it is doesn’t function as he would like". He also sees that Spencer "does not penetrate or understand the mysterious, aristocratic, vagabond, rebel individual!".

And so he is critical of thinkers such as "Darwin, Comte, Spencer and Marx" which he sees as sociologists who will tend to not being "able to understand the varied, the particular,... sacrifices the one or the other on the altar of the universal." Instead he takes sides with authors who are for him "the giants of Art and Thought like Nietzsche, Stirner, Ibsen, Wilde, Zola, Huysmans, Verlaine, Mallarmé...".

Influence 
The notorious Italo-Argentinian anarchist Severino Di Giovanni dedicated a poem to Novatore shortly after knowing about his death. Later he will establish the "Anarcho-individualist Group Renzo Novatore" which enters the “Italian Anti-fascist Alliance” in Argentina.

Renzo Novatore has received attention recently in post-left anarchy and insurrectionary anarchism as can be seen in the writings of Wolfi Landstreicher. In his introduction to "Towards the Creative nothing" by Renzo Novatore, Landstreicher writes "It is difficult to find anarchist works in English that are at the same time "individualist" and explicitly revolutionary, that emphasize the centrality of the aim of individual self-determination to a revolution that will "communalize material wealth" as it will "individualize spiritual wealth". For this and other reasons I chose to translate Toward the Creative Nothing by Renzo Novatore and publish several of his shorter pieces." In an article called "Whither now? Some thoughts on creating anarchy" Wolfi Landstreicher writing as Feral Faun says "Then we can cease to be merely on the margins of society and will each, as unique wild beings, become the center of an insurrectionary project that may destroy civilization and create a world in which we freely live, relate and create as our unique desires move us. We will become – to quote Renzo Novatore again – "a shadow eclipsing any form of society which can exist under the sun."

Bibliography
  (The Anarchist Library)

See also
Individualist anarchism in Europe
Anarchism in Italy
Bruno Filippi
Biennio rosso
Illegalism
Post-left anarchism
Anarchism and Friedrich Nietzsche

References

Sources

External links
 
  NovAtore.it Sito dedicato alla memoria di Renzo Novatore mostly in Italian with a small section in English and includes many of Novatore's works in English
Archive of Renzo Novatore´s writings in english at the Anarchist Library
"Twilight Dance" by Renzo Novatore a long poem
"The expropiator" by Renzo Novatore an essay in praise of illegalism and individual reclamation

1890 births
1922 deaths
20th-century Italian philosophers
Anti–World War I activists
Critics of work and the work ethic
Egoist anarchists
Futurist writers
Illegalists
Individualist anarchists
Insurrectionary anarchists
Italian anarchists
Italian atheists
Italian anti-fascists
Italian male poets
People from the Province of La Spezia
20th-century Italian poets
20th-century Italian male writers